West Seattle Christian School is a private Christian school located in West Seattle, which offers preschool and K-8 instruction.  As of 2005–2006, preschool enrollment is 70, and regular school enrollment is 110.

References

External links
Official Website
Lost in Seattle website entry for West Seattle Christian School
Seattle Times entry for West Seattle Christian School

Christian schools in Washington (state)
Private elementary schools in Washington (state)
Schools in Seattle
Private middle schools in Washington (state)